Panče Georgievski (born 29 June 1973) is a retired Macedonian footballer who made his career in North Macedonia, Slovenia, Serbia and Portugal.

Club career
Born in Skopje, SR Macedonia, SFR Yugoslavia, he played with FK Vardar until 1998 when he first moved abroad.  That year he signed with Publikum Celje and played in the Slovenian First League.  In the next season he joined FK Čukarički and played in the First League of FR Yugoslavia.  In 2000, he moved to Portugal and played 2 seasons with FC Felgueiras in the Portuguese Second League.  Later he continued his career in Portugal and played with Vilaverdense FC, Portimonense SC, Esperança Lagos, Guia and Alvorense.

International career
At international level, Georgievski played for Macedonia U-21.

Honours
Vardar
Macedonian First League (3): 1992–93, 1993–94, 1994–95
Macedonian Cup: 1993, 1995, 1998

References

1973 births
Living people
Footballers from Skopje
Association football forwards
Macedonian footballers
North Macedonia under-21 international footballers
FK Vardar players
NK Celje players
FK Čukarički players
F.C. Felgueiras players
Portimonense S.C. players
Macedonian First Football League players
Slovenian PrvaLiga players
First League of Serbia and Montenegro players
Macedonian expatriate footballers
Expatriate footballers in Slovenia
Macedonian expatriate sportspeople in Slovenia
Expatriate footballers in Serbia and Montenegro
Macedonian expatriate sportspeople in Serbia and Montenegro
Expatriate footballers in Portugal
Macedonian expatriate sportspeople in Portugal